Jean Robin may refer to:

 Jean Robin (botanist) (1550–1629)
 Jean Robin (field hockey)
 Jean Robin (footballer) (1921–2004)
 Jean Robin (writer) (born 1946)